The Pays d'Auge (literally Land of Auge) is an area in Normandy, straddling the départements of Calvados and Orne (plus a small part of the territory of Eure). The chief town is Lisieux.

Geography
Generally it consists of the basin of the Touques River.

The Pays d'Auge is divided into the following cantons: Canton of Cabourg, Canton of Dozulé, Canton of Trouville Deauville, Canton of Honfleur, Canton of Troarn, Canton of Cambremer, Canton of Pont-l'Evêque, Canton of Blangy-le-Château, Canton of Mézidon-Canon, Canton of Lisieux, Canton of Saint-Pierre-sur-Dives, Canton of Livarot, Canton of Orbec, Canton of Trun, Canton of Vimoutiers, Canton of Exmes and Canton of Gacé.

Economy
The landscape of this area is considered typical of Normandy—agricultural and producing dairy produce and apples. It is noted for its cheeses, especially Camembert (named for a place in Pays d'Auge), Livarot and Pont-l'Évêque, also names of villages.

The Pays d'Auge has been granted appellation contrôlée status for its cider and calvados.

Culture
The Norman dialect of the Pays d'Auge is known as Augeron. The Pays d'Auge is classed as a Land of Art and History by the national Ministry of Culture.

References

See also
Paul Bunel

Former provinces of France
Geography of Normandy
Geography of Calvados (department)
Geography of Orne
Geography of Eure
Lisieux